Ivan Ďurač (born July 17, 1997) is a Czech professional ice hockey player. He is currently playing for BK Mladá Boleslav of the Czech Extraliga.

Ďurač made his Czech Extraliga debut playing with BK Mladá Boleslav during the 2015-16 Czech Extraliga season.

References

External links

1997 births
Living people
BK Mladá Boleslav players
Czech ice hockey forwards
Hokej Šumperk 2003 players
Sportspeople from Mladá Boleslav
HC Benátky nad Jizerou players
Orlik Opole players
Czech expatriate ice hockey people
Expatriate ice hockey players in  Poland
Czech expatriate sportspeople in Poland